Click & Collect is a British comedy television film directed by Ben Palmer, written by Joe Tucker and Lloyd Woolf, and starring Asim Chaudhry and Stephen Merchant.

Plot
Uptight Andrew Bennett lives in a semi-detached house in Bedford. When he fails to buy his daughter's main Christmas present - Sparklehoof the Unicorn Princess - he is rescued by over-friendly, emotionally needy Christmas-loving Dev D'Cruz, who lives in the adjoining house. Dev has decorated Andrew’s house with tacky Christmas lights without asking. Andrew can’t sleep due to the bright lights so he pretends that the council is phoning him about a complaint in front of Dev. He also writes him an angry letter saying that they are not friends, but his wife tells him not to give it to him. Dev has managed to buy perhaps the last Sparklehoof in the UK - by click and collect. Unfortunately it is 270 miles away in Carlisle, so Andrew and Dev embark together on a cross-country Christmas Eve road trip to attempt to save Andrew's daughter's Christmas but Andrew considers him lucky as he has to deal with the extended family coming over. Dev feels upset that his children are with his ex that year. At a petrol station the wrong fuel is accidentally put into the car so Andrew rents a buggy.

Cast and characters
 Stephen Merchant as Andrew Bennett
 Asim Chaudhry as Dev D'Cruz
 Sophia Di Martino as Claire Bennett

Reception
Click & Collect received positive reviews across the British press. The Guardian described it "funny and tender", The Observer as "excellent", Stephen Merchant and Asim Chaudhry were described by The Telegraph as "a mismatch made in heaven". A number of reviewers noted the similarities with Planes, Trains and Automobiles and Jingle All The Way, with The Times noting that "these references are done with a wink". Metro described it as "comforting, sharply written Christmas TV", whilst The Daily Telegraph praised the "lively script" and "warm hearted satire", stating: "Click and Collect offered proof that, in certain circumstances, it is possible to have your cake and eat it. It subjected Christmas to a testy satirical buffeting while also smothering it with reverence as an enfolding nationwide group hug."

See also
 List of Christmas films

References

External links
 

2010s buddy comedy films
2010s Christmas comedy films
2010s comedy road movies
2018 comedy films
2018 films
2018 television films
Bedford
British buddy comedy films
British Christmas comedy films
British comedy road movies
Carlisle, Cumbria
Christmas television films
2010s English-language films
Films set in Bedfordshire
Films set in Cumbria
Films directed by Ben Palmer
2010s British films
British comedy television films